The American Immigration Council is a Washington, D.C.-based 501(c)(3) nonprofit organization and advocacy group. It was established in 1987, originally as the American Immigration Law Foundation, by the American Immigration Lawyers Association. 

The organization conducts research and policy analysis, provides legal resources for attorneys, produces resources for public education, engages in grassroots and direct advocacy, and files litigation related to immigration issues. It operates at the national level as well as through state-based and local programs.

In 2022, the American Immigration Council merged with the former New American Economy.

References

External links

501(c)(3) organizations
Migration-related organizations based in the United States
Organizations established in 1987
Advocacy groups in the United States
Non-profit organizations based in Washington, D.C.